The Nerineidae is an extinct taxonomic family of fossil sea snails, marine gastropod mollusks in the informal group Lower Heterobranchia.

Genera
Genera within the family Nerineidae include:
 Nerinea, the type genus
 Bactroptyxis

References 

 The Taxonomicon

External links